EastWind is an album by Andy Irvine and Davy Spillane, showcasing a fusion of Irish folk music with traditional Bulgarian and Macedonian music. Produced by Irvine and Bill Whelan, who also contributed keyboards and piano, it was widely regarded as revolutionary at recording.

The extensive line-up included Nikola Parov on Bulgarian instruments (gadulka, kaval, gaida) & Greek bouzouki, Máirtín O'Connor (accordion), Noel Eccles & Paul Moran (percussion), Tony Molloy (bass), Carl Geraghty & Kenneth Edge (saxophones), John Sheahan (fiddle), Anthony Drennan (guitar), Mícheál Ó Súilleabháin (piano), Márta Sebestyén (vocals) and Rita Connolly (backing vocals).

In an interview with Folk Roots in August 1992, Irvine stated: "We finished it eighteen months ago but (...) John Cook at Tara wanted to try the avenue of big companies." The album was eventually released on the Tara label itself in mid-1992.

Subsequently, Irvine and Parov were joined by Rens van der Zalm and toured together in Europe as the 'East Wind Trio', and then again in the US during 1996, prior to forming the band Mozaik in 2002, which covers several of this album's tracks.

Overview
Andy Irvine noted that the album was originally conceived as a Bulgarian/jazz fusion album, and only changed direction "somewhere along the line" during production.

The album opens with "Chetvorno Horo", a Bulgarian dance tune in  time (3–2–2) played by the whole band, with chord progressions underpinning melodic phrases played in unison by Irvine (bouzouki) and O'Connor (accordion).

Then comes "Mechkin Kamen" ("The Bear's Rock"), a slow Macedonian song sung by Sebestyén, with backing vocals by Connolly.

"Illyrian Dawn" is a Bulgarian slow air, with Spillane on low whistle first, then on uilleann pipes, accompanied by Whelan on keyboards.

"Pride of Macedonia" is a collection of melodies in  time.

"Antice" is another Macedonian tune, in  time, recorded by Swets and Čalgija in 1978.

Sebestyén sings again on the next piece, "Kadana", a slow song that girls in the Rhodope Mountains of Bulgaria would sing about the problems and prohibitions of love affairs in their communities.

The album closes with "Hard on the Heels", a re-working of "Smeceno Horo" (meaning "broken dance") which Irvine first recorded with Planxty on After The Break.

Reception and influence

The album was released to critical acclaim. Richard Foss of AllMusic retrospectively wrote that "though many Celtic musicians have been interested by the exotic rhythms of Bulgarian and Macedonian music, this CD is one of the only instances in which the fusion sounds both natural and exciting," and he "highly recommended" the album. Ken Hyder's favourable review in the September 1992 issue of Hi-Fi News and Record Review said that "Davy Spillane's fans will love it; as will all those who fondly remember Andy Irvine's work with Planxty. A musical adventure which succeeds brilliantly."

This project would have a profound influence on the future genesis of the highly successful Riverdance:

Track listing
 "Chetvorno Horo" – 3:48
 "The Bear's Rock" – 3:31
 "Dance of Suleiman" – 5:30
 "Illyrian Dawn" – 3:25
 "Pride of Macedonia" – 3:17
 "Antice" – 5:42
 "Two Steps to the Bar" – 4:07
 "Kadana" – 5:42
 "Hard on the Heels" – 5:53

Personnel
Andy Irvine  – bouzouki, hurdy-gurdy
Davy Spillane – uilleann pipes, low whistle
Nikola Parov – gadulka, kaval, gaida, bouzouki
Bill Whelan – keyboards, piano
Anthony Drennan – guitar
Tony Molloy – bass
Paul Moran – percussion
Noel Eccles – percussion
Máirtín O'Connor – accordion
Carl Garaghty – saxophone
Mícheál Ó Súilleabháin – piano
Márta Sebestyén – vocals
Rita Connolly – backing vocals
Produced by Bill Whelan
Executive producer – Andy Irvine
Recorded at Westland Studios, Dublin
Engineered by Philip Begley

References

Record Label Catalogue 2010
Album Sleevenotes

1992 albums
Andy Irvine (musician) albums
Davy Spillane albums
World music albums
Celtic fusion albums